A waterway society is a society, association, charitable trust, club, trust or "Friends" group involved in the restoration, preservation, use and enjoyment of waterways, e.g. a canal, river, navigation or other waterway, and their associated buildings and structures, e.g. locks, tunnels, etc.

See also
List of waterway societies in the United Kingdom
List of waterway societies in Ireland

Waterways organisations in the United Kingdom